Loud Like Nature is the fifth and final album by UK electronica group Add N to (X), released in 2002 through Mute Records.

Track listing
 "Total All Out Water" – 3:51
 "Electric Village" – 3:36
 "Sheez Mine" – 3:48
 "Invasion of the Polaroid People" – 4:40
 "Party Bag" – 4:56
 "Quantum Leap" – 4:45
 "Pink Light" – 5:42
 "Up the Punks" – 3:48
 "Take Me to Your Leader" – 3:35
 "Lick a Battery (Tongues Across the Terminals)" – 3:07
 ".-U Baby" – 1:41
 "Large Number" – 3:18
 "All Night Lazy" – 4:17

References

Add N to (X) albums
2002 albums
Mute Records albums